Katharine Hall (born January 6, 1987) is an American former professional cyclist, who rode professionally between 2014 and 2020, for the , and  teams.

Personal life
Hall attended Pomona College, graduating in 2009. In 2015, Hall graduated from the University of California, Berkeley with a Master of Science (MS) degree in molecular toxicology.

Major results

2013
 1st Mt. Tam Hill Climb
 1st Three Summits Road Race, Mt. Hood Cycling Classic
 1st Esparto Time Trial
 1st Patterson Pass Road Race
 2nd Vacaville Grand Prix
 3rd Oakland Grand Prix
 4th Road race, National Collegiate Road Championships
 4th Giro di San Francisco
2014
 1st Nevada City Classic Bicycle Race
 2nd Wente Vineyards Classic Road Race and Criterium
 3rd Snelling Road Race
 5th Road race, National Road Championships
 6th Grand Prix el Salvador
2015
 1st Stage 6 Thüringen Rundfahrt der Frauen
 2nd Overall Tour of the Gila
 4th Overall Tour of California
1st Stage 1
 4th Overall Redlands Bicycle Classic
 4th Overall Tour Femenino de San Luis
1st  Mountains classification
1st Stage 5
2016
 1st  Overall Tour Femenino de San Luis
1st  Mountains classification
1st Stage 5
 1st  Mountains classification The Women's Tour
 6th Overall Tour of the Gila
 7th Overall Tour of California
2017
 2nd Overall Tour of the Gila
1st  Mountains classification
1st Stages 1 & 5
 2nd Overall Tour of California
1st  Mountains classification
1st Stage 2
 6th Overall Joe Martin Stage Race
 10th Overall Tour de Feminin-O cenu Českého Švýcarska
2018
 1st  Overall Tour of California
1st  Mountains classification
1st Stage 2
 1st  Overall Colorado Classic
1st Stage 2 (ITT)
 1st  Overall Joe Martin Stage Race
1st Stage 3 (ITT)
 1st  Overall Tour of the Gila
1st Stage 1
 1st  Overall Redlands Bicycle Classic
1st Stage 2
 5th Overall Tour Cycliste Féminin International de l'Ardèche
 7th La Course by Le Tour de France
 9th Overall Tour de Feminin-O cenu Českého Švýcarska
1st  Mountains classification
2019
 2nd Overall Tour of California
1st Stage 2
 7th Overall Giro Rosa
 8th Overall Setmana Ciclista Valenciana
 8th Overall Colorado Classic
2020
 6th Overall Setmana Ciclista Valenciana

References

External links

Living people
American female cyclists
1987 births
21st-century American women
Pomona College alumni
UC Berkeley College of Natural Resources alumni